Kemberton is a civil parish in Shropshire, England.  It contains nine listed buildings that are recorded in the National Heritage List for England.  All the listed buildings are designated at Grade II, the lowest of the three grades, which is applied to "buildings of national importance and special interest".  The parish includes the village of Kemberton and the surrounding countryside.  All the listed buildings are in or near the centre of the village, and consist of a church and memorials in the churchyard, houses, farmhouses and farm buildings.


Buildings

References

Citations

Sources

Lists of buildings and structures in Shropshire